Fin is a 2021 American documentary film directed by Eli Roth. It follows Roth and a group of scientists, activists, and researchers who travel around the world exposing the extinction of sharks. Leonardo DiCaprio and Nina Dobrev serve as executive producers, and Lionsgate, Pilgrim Media Group and Appian Way Productions, producing with Discovery+ distributing.

The film was released on July 13, 2021, by Discovery+.

References

External links
 

2021 films
2021 documentary films
Films produced by Leonardo DiCaprio
Lionsgate films
Appian Way Productions films
Films directed by Eli Roth
2020s English-language films